Cathy Busby is Canadian artist based in Vancouver, BC. Born in Toronto, Ontario, on April 20, 1958, Busby is an artist who has a long-time interest in posters and printed matter and their potential for grassroots communication. She worked as an artist-activist in the 80's and has been exhibiting her work internationally over the past 20 years. She has a PhD in Communication (Concordia University, Montreal, 1999) and was a Fulbright Scholar at New York University (1995–96).

Background

Education 
Busby completed a Bachelor of Fine Arts (1984) from the Nova Scotia College of Art and Design. She has an MA in Media Studies (Concordia University, 1992) and a PhD in Communication from Concordia University (Montreal, 1999).

Teaching and Writing 
Busby is currently an Adjunct Professor of visual art in the UBC Department of Art History, Visual Art and Theory.

Busby is co-editor of and contributor to the anthology When Pain Strikes (University of Minnesota, 1999). Her critical writing and artworks have been published in Image, Index and Inscription: Essays on Contemporary Canadian Photography (Gallery 44, YYZ Press, 2005) and General Idea Editions 1967–1995 (Blackwood Gallery, 2003), as well as C Magazine, Fuse, Tessara, Border/lines and Archivaria. She has a BFA from the Nova Scotia College of Art and Design, an MA in Media Studies (1992) and a PhD in Communication (1999) from Concordia University, Montreal.

Artwork 
Busby has shown in Berlin at the Emerson Gallery of posters collected in Halifax entitled The North End. Other recent exhibitions include Sorry, Saint Mary's University Art Gallery, Halifax and McMaster Museum of Art, Hamilton (2005); Totalled, Carleton University Art Gallery, Ottawa (2004); Testdrive, eyelevelgallery, Halifax (2002); How…, Gallery 101, Ottawa (2001). Her work is held in the collection of the National Gallery of Canada.

Collections 
Busby has works in the public collections of several galleries, including the Winnipeg Art Gallery, National Gallery of Canada, Carleton University Art Gallery, Nova Scotia Art Bank, Canada Council (Art Bank), City of Ottawa, and the Nova Scotia College of Art and Design.

Selected works

WE CALL 
Busby's WE CALL uses the Truth and Reconciliation Commission of Canada's (TRC) 94 "Calls to Action" to draw attention to the ways in which the government skirts responsibilities towards Indigenous rights and title. WE CALL was produced as an installation at the Teck Gallery (Simon Fraser University) and was a part of community based project in Hazelton, BC at the Gitksan Wet'suwet'en Education Society (GWES).

We Are Sorry 
One of Cathy Busby's best-known works, We Are Sorry (Melbourne 2009 / Winnipeg 2010), commemorated public apologies by Canadian and Australian heads of state to the Indian Residential School survivors in Canada and the Stolen Generations in Australia. While these landmark apologies had been relatively fleeting media moments when they were first delivered, We Are Sorry prolonged their public presence. In Melbourne, We Are Sorry took place outdoors as part of the Laneway Commissions and the following year it was presented in Eckhardt Hall at the Winnipeg Art Gallery in conjunction with the launch of the Truth and Reconciliation Commission (2010).

References

External links
Cathy Busby
PARKING 2019
MOMMY Interview
Hyperallergic review of About Face
domus review of About Face
Public Acts
Canadian Art Magazine

Canadian contemporary artists
Living people
1958 births
Canadian poster artists
Canadian women artists
Artists from Nova Scotia
NSCAD University alumni
Women graphic designers